Greatest Hits is a compilation album by the American hard rock band Guns N' Roses, released on March 23, 2004. Released by Geffen Records in part because of the delay in the making of Chinese Democracy, the album was subject to lawsuits by band member Axl Rose and former band members, in an attempt to block its release due to its track listing.

Despite the album having almost no promotion, it reached number one on the UK Albums Chart and number three on the Billboard 200 chart upon its release. Greatest Hits re-entered the Billboard 200 at number three in March 2012, selling about 85,000 copies as part of a promotion by both Amazon and Google Play that saw the album sold for 25 cents for one day. The album has proven a popular seller, selling over six million copies in the United States by 2018. Greatest Hits is one of the longest charting albums in the Billboard 200 era, being one of only seven albums to notch at least 400 weeks on the chart by June 2017. As of April 2022, it has spent 568 weeks on the chart.

Lawsuit
Axl Rose immediately tried to block the release by suing Geffen, saying it would ruin his focus on Chinese Democracy and if he were to get the album finished and released sooner, the Greatest Hits album would be selling more, leaving the album unnoticed. Former bandmates Slash and Duff McKagan helped Rose file the lawsuit against Geffen, although they did not speak to each other in person. The lawsuit failed and the album was released under Geffen Records' rights.

Reception

The album received mixed reviews, with several critics complaining of the track listing, feeling several notable songs were missing.
AllMusic criticized the album for "(giving) an inaccurate portrait of the band", saying "it bears all the hallmarks of a slapdash compilation, hastily assembled by the label as a way to buy time between releases. There are no liner notes, the cardboard packaging is flimsy, (&) the remastering isn't notable." The review singled out "Nightrain", "Estranged", "It's So Easy", "Mr. Brownstone" and "Used to Love Her" as songs that should have been on the album but weren't.

Pop Matters stated the album "does nothing to enhance the legacy of a once-proud rock band. There are no hidden insights into the inner workings of the group, no lost classics, and no evidence of their contribution to a new generation of musicians. Instead we are left with an inflated sticker price for a Pandora's box of tracks..." Pitchfork criticized the compilation for having too many covers, as well as not including songs such as "Out Ta Get Me", "Used to Love Her", and "One in a Million". BBC criticized the songs for being dated. The Maneater stated "The appearance of the album gives the impression of a record company that focused solely on the fact that people would buy the album even if it were wrapped in brown wrapping paper." and criticized the compilation for not including songs such as "Estranged", "Mr. Brownstone", and "Pretty Tied Up".

In a positive review, NME stated " It’s packed with pomp, spunk and circumstance, makes blokes want to fight and girls want to dance. What the fuck else is there?".

Track listing

Personnel
Credits are adapted from the album's liner notes.

Guns N' Roses
W. Axl Rose – lead vocals, percussion on "Welcome to the Jungle", whistling on "Patience" and "Civil War", synthesizer and whistle on "Paradise City", keyboards on "Since I Don't Have You" and "Live and Let Die", piano on "November Rain, "Yesterdays," and "Sympathy for the Devil." 
Slash – lead guitar, acoustic guitar on "Civil War","Sweet Child o' Mine and "Knockin' On Heaven's Door", lead acoustic guitar on "Patience"
Izzy Stradlin – rhythm guitar (on tracks 1, 2, 4–11 and Shadow of Your Love), rhythm acoustic guitar on "Patience", backing vocals on tracks 1–11
Duff McKagan – bass, backing vocals, rhythm acoustic guitar on "Patience"
Steven Adler – drums (on tracks 1, 2, 4, and 6 and Shadow of Your Love and Civil War), backing vocals on "Patience"
Matt Sorum – drums and backing vocals on tracks 5, 7–14
Dizzy Reed – keyboards and piano on tracks 5–14, organ
Gilby Clarke – rhythm guitar and backing vocals on "Ain't It Fun" and "Since I Don't Have You"
Paul Huge – rhythm guitar on "Sympathy for the Devil"

Additional personnel

Michael Monroe – co-lead vocals on "Ain't It Fun"
Mike Staggs – additional guitars on "Ain't It Fun"
West Arkeen – percussion on "Patience"
Rick Richards – percussion on "Patience"
Ray Grden – percussion on "Patience"
Howard Teman – percussion on "Patience"
The Waters – backing vocals on "Knockin' on Heaven's Door"
Shannon Hoon – backing vocals on "Live and Let Die", "November Rain", co-lead vocals on "Don't Cry"

Johann Langlie – programming on "Live and Let Die", "November Rain"
Reba Shaw – backing vocals on "November Rain"
Stuart Bailey – backing vocals on "November Rain"
Jon Thautwein – horn on "Live and Let Die"
Matthew McKagan – horn on "Live and Let Die"
Rachel West – horn on "Live and Let Die"
Robert Clark – horn on "Live and Let Die"

Charts

Weekly charts

Year-end charts

Sales and certifications

References

Guns N' Roses compilation albums
2004 greatest hits albums
Albums produced by Mike Clink
Geffen Records compilation albums